Chek or CHEK may refer to:

 Chek (brand), soft drink brand of Winn-Dixie
 Chek (unit), a traditional Chinese unit of length
 CHEK-DT, a TV station in Victoria, British Columbia, Canada
 chek, the Hong Kong English spelling of "尺", the Hong Kong foot unit of measure, see Shaku
 places in Kyrgyzstan:
Chek, Batken, in Batken District, Batken Region
Chek, Bazar-Korgon, in Bazar-Korgon District, Jalal-Abad Region
Chek, Suzak, in Suzak District, Jalal-Abad Region
 Quick Chek, a chain of convenience stores based in New Jersey
 Sport Chek, Canadian retailer of sports clothing and equipment

See also
Check (disambiguation)
The Cheks, an Australian band